The Aboriginal Witnesses Act was a series ordinances and amendments enacted by lieutenant Governor George Grey, Governor of South Australia during the early colonial period of South Australia. The act was established "To facilitate the admission of the unsworn testimony of Aboriginal inhabitants of South Australia and parts adjacent".

Despite the act's stated aims being to facilitate Aboriginal testimony, it had the opposite effect, creating a situation where the massacre of Aboriginal peoples by European colonisers could not be tried solely on the evidence of Aboriginal witnesses.

History
The lieutenant governor George Grey was responsible for the act, and later lieutenant governor Frederick Robe was responsible for the act's amendments. While its stated aim was to make provisions for unsworn testimony by "uncivilised people" to be admissible in court, the act made it possible for a judge to dismiss the testimony of an "uncivilised person or persons" as insufficient unless corroborated by other evidence - that the court could not base the conviction of a white man on the testimony of an aboriginal witness alone. Although it was a progressive law for the time, the act decreed that the credibility of the evidence be left to the discretion of "the justice of the court, or jury under direction of the judge". The act also made Aboriginal testimony inadmissible in trials that carried the penalty of death.

Effectively, the act created a situation where settler solidarity and the law of evidence ensured that the murder and massacre of aboriginal Australians by European colonisers could not be tried solely on the evidence of aboriginal witnesses. Possibly in response to the Avenue Range Station massacre, where three Tanganekald women, two teenage girls, three infants, and an "old man blind and infirm" were murdered by Australian mass murderer and pastoralist James Brown, the Aboriginal Witnesses Act of 1848 was amended in July 1849 to allow a person to be convicted on the sole testimony of an aboriginal person, though this rarely occurred.

The act remained in force until 1929.

See also
 Aboriginal Cultural Heritage Act 2003
 Aboriginal Heritage Act 1988
 Aboriginal Heritage Act 2006
 Aboriginal Lands Act 1995
 Aboriginal Land Rights Act 1976
 Aboriginal Protection Act 1869
 Australian heritage law
 Half-Caste Act
 Native Title Act 1993

References

1844 in Australia
1844 in British law
19th century in South Australia
Indigenous Australians in South Australia
Australian frontier wars
Legislation concerning indigenous peoples
Public policy in Australia